is a railway station in Nishi-ku, Kobe, Hyōgo Prefecture, Japan.

Lines
Kobe Municipal Subway
Seishin-Yamate Line Station S17

Layout

Railway stations in Hyōgo Prefecture
Stations of Kobe Municipal Subway
Railway stations in Japan opened in 1987